Brian Ronald Hunter (born March 4, 1968) is a former professional baseball player. He played all or parts of nine seasons in Major League Baseball between 1991 and 2000 for the Atlanta Braves, Pittsburgh Pirates, Cincinnati Reds, Seattle Mariners, St. Louis Cardinals and Philadelphia Phillies. While he was primarily a first baseman, he also appeared in nearly 100 games as an outfielder. He is currently a scout for the Braves.

Career
Drafted by the Atlanta Braves in the 8th round of the 1987 amateur draft, Hunter appeared in three World Series in 1991, 1992 and 1999 as a member of the Braves. Hunter hit a home run in Game 5 of the 1991 series in a 14–5 Braves victory over the Minnesota Twins. He hit a two-run home run in the first inning of the deciding game 7 of the 1991 National League Championship Series at Three Rivers Stadium vs the Pittsburgh Pirates; the Braves won the game 4–0, advancing to the 1991 World Series to face the Minnesota Twins.

Hunter is the brother of basketball player Loree Moore.

External links
, or Retrosheet, or Pelota Binaria (Venezuelan Winter League)

1968 births
Living people
African-American baseball players
American expatriate baseball players in Canada
American expatriate baseball players in Mexico
Atlanta Braves players
Atlanta Braves scouts
Atlantic City Surf players
Baseball players from Torrance, California
Burlington Braves players
Calgary Cannons players
Cardenales de Lara players
American expatriate baseball players in Venezuela
Cerritos Falcons baseball players
Cincinnati Reds players
Durham Bulls players
Greenville Braves players
Indianapolis Indians players
Major League Baseball first basemen
Mexican League baseball left fielders
New York Mets scouts
Philadelphia Phillies players
Pittsburgh Pirates players
Pulaski Braves players
Richmond Braves players
St. Louis Cardinals players
Saraperos de Saltillo players
Seattle Mariners players
Syracuse SkyChiefs players
Tacoma Rainiers players
Washington Nationals scouts
21st-century African-American people
20th-century African-American sportspeople